The Mission School (sometimes called "New Folk" or "Urban Rustic") is an art movement of the 1990s and 2000s, centered in the Mission District, San Francisco, California.

History and characteristics
This movement is generally considered to have emerged in the early 1990s around a core group of artists who attended (or were associated with) San Francisco Art Institute. The term "Mission School", however, was not coined until 2002, in a San Francisco Bay Guardian article by Glen Helfand.

The Mission School is closely aligned with the larger lowbrow art movement, and can be considered to be a regional expression of that movement. Artists of the Mission School take their inspiration from the urban, bohemian, "street" culture of the Mission District and are strongly influenced by mural and graffiti art, comic and cartoon art, and folk art forms such as sign painting and hobo art. These artists are also noted for use of non-traditional artistic materials, such as house paint, spray paint, correction fluid, ballpoint pens, scrapboard, and found objects. Gallery work by these artists is often displayed using the "cluster method", in which a number of individual works (sometimes by different artists) are clustered closely together on a gallery wall, rather than the traditional gallery display method of widely separating individual works.

Street art has always been an important part of the Mission School aesthetic. Several Mission School artists crossed over into San Francisco's burgeoning graffiti art scene of the 1990s, notably Barry McGee (who wrote under the name "Twist"), Ruby Neri (a.k.a. "Reminisce"), Dan "Plasma" Rauch, and Margaret Kilgallen (a.k.a. "Meta").

Artists
Artists considered to be part of the Mission School (past or present) have included:

 Barry McGee
 Margaret Kilgallen
 Chris Johanson
 Alicia McCarthy
 Ruby Neri
 Rigo 23
 Clare Rojas
 Thomas Campbell
 Scott Williams
 Bill Daniel

The profiles of these artists were raised by the inclusion of the work of Barry McGee in the 2001 Venice Biennale and the works of Chris Johanson and Margaret Kilgallen in the 2002 Whitney Biennial.

New Mission School
In 2003, not long after the term "Mission School" was coined, a panel at the Commonwealth Club of California named several emerging San Francisco artists as constituting a "New Mission School". These artists included Andrew Schoultz, Dave Warnke, Sirron Norris, Neonski, Ricardo, Damon Soule, Misk, and NoMe, though many of these artists do not embrace the "Mission School" label.

Criticism

The term Mission School has been criticized for being too geographically specific (many artists outside of San Francisco share this aesthetic, while others living in the Mission District do not), while at the same time being a vague catch-all, with many artists who are referred to as Mission School having a hard time seeing how they are part of this "school".

Galleries and other venues
Galleries, museums, and sites closely associated with the Mission School include:
 Adobe Books
 Southern Exposure Gallery
 New Langton Arts
 Yerba Buena Center for the Arts
 Deitch Projects
 Luggage Store Gallery
 Jack Hanley Gallery

References

Further reading
 Buchner, Clark. 2006. "Profit-free zone". Art Review 4(5):92–95.
 Drescher, Timothy W. 1998. "Street subversion: the political geography of murals and graffiti". In: Brook J, Carlsson C, Peters NJ (eds). Reclaiming San Francisco: History, Politics, Culture: A City Lights Anthology. 
 Rinder, Lawrence. 2005. "Learning at the Mission School". Parkett 74:186–190.
 Bay Area Now: A Regional Survey of Contemporary Art, Yerba Buena Center for the Arts, 1997.

External links
 "ENERGY THAT IS ALL AROUND" exhibition, San Francisco Art Institute
 Jackson, Stephanie Lee. "Stories – Opinions", 2001-2005. Includes biographical and anecdotal sketches of Barry McGee, Margaret Kilgallen, and Alicia McCarthy
 "Spray Can Writers Erupt" by Timothy W Drescher, Shaping San Francisco Digital Library.
 Bonetti, David. "The young at art", San Francisco Examiner, June 18, 1997.
 Smith, Roberta. "Art in Review: 'Widely Unknown'", The New York Times, December 14, 2001.
 Drescher, Timothy W. "Clarion Alley and Post-modernism", Shaping San Francisco Digital Library.
 Rapoport, Lynn. "Wall space: The Clarion Alley Mural Project uses public art to paint a home", San Francisco Bay Guardian, October 23, 2002.
 Pollack, Barbara. "The New Visionaries", ARTnews, December 2003.
 Chennault, Sam. "Graffiti to Gallery", SF Weekly, September 1, 2004.
 transit gallery - gallery of Mission street art
 Fecal Face Dot Com – Bay Area arts website focusing on the current generation of Mission School artists

Contemporary art movements
Culture of San Francisco
Artists from California
Artists from the San Francisco Bay Area
American muralists
Mission District, San Francisco
Graffiti in the United States